Martin Owusu-Antwi (born April 15, 1995) is a Ghanaian sprinter specializing in the 100 meters and 200 meters. He gained his first international experience in the 2015 Summer Universiade in Gwangju and also in the Ghana 4 x 100 meters relay. He also took part in the 2018 Commonwealth Games in the Australian Gold Coast running in the 200 meter race. He then went on to participate for the first time in the African Games in Rabat where he reached the semifinals and won his first Gold medal in the Men's 4 × 100 metres relay.

Athletics 
Martin Owusu-Antwi won his first international experience at the 2015 Summer Universiade in Gwangju, where he was eliminated in the 100-meter race with 10.97 seconds in the quarterfinals and with the Ghana 4-by-100-meter relay with 39, Eliminated in the preliminary round in 99s. The following year he retired from the Durban African Championship in the 200-meter race with 21.02 s in the semi-finals and finished sixth in the relay in 40.21 s. In 2018 he participated in the Commonwealth Games on the Australian Gold Coast, over 200 meters, and there he reached the semifinals, where he was eliminated with 25.95 seconds. In 2019 he participated for the first time in the African Games in Rabat and reached the semifinals of more than 200 meters, in which he was eliminated with 20.97 s and won the gold medal with the relay with a new player record of 38, 30 s. This gave him a starting place in the Doha World Championship relay, in which 38.24 seconds were not enough for a final. Martin Owusu-Antwi is a student at Coppin State University in Baltimore.

Personal bests 
 100 meters: 10.45 s (+0.6 m / s), May 11, 2019 in Charlotte
 60 meters (hall): 6.72 s, February 25, 2018, in Boston
 200 meters: 20.70 s (+0.3 m / s), May 24, 2019 in Jacksonville
 200 meters (hall): 20.79 s, February 25, 2018, in Boston

International competitions

Collegiate competitions

Representing Coppin State Eagles

References

External links 

Living people
1995 births
Ghanaian male sprinters
Athletes (track and field) at the 2019 African Games
African Games competitors for Ghana
African Games medalists in athletics (track and field)
African Games gold medalists for Ghana